Amanda Warren (born July 17, 1982) is an American actress. She is known for her role as Lucy Warburton on the HBO drama series The Leftovers
and as Betty on the AppleTV+ comedy series Dickinson.

Early life 
Amanda Warren was born on July 17, 1982, in New York City. She studied singing at Professional Performing Arts School in New York.

Career 
In the late 2000s, Warren began appearing in small roles in several American television series and films. In 2010, she appeared in several guest-starring television roles, including Rubicon, Gossip Girl, The Good Wife, and Law & Order.

In 2014, Warren portrayed Lucy Warburton on HBO's drama television series The Leftovers. Her film credits include The Adjustment Bureau (2011), Seven Psychopaths (2012), All Is Bright (2013), Deep Powder (2013), Three Billboards Outside Ebbing, Missouri (2017), and Mother! (2017).

Warren signed on for an CBS political drama pilot titled Ways & Means in February 2020. The pilot, written by Mike Murphy and Ed Redlich, depicts a powerful congressional leader who has lost faith in politics, with Warren as the former community organizer and progressive activist Jerlene Brooks. In May 2021, CBS passed on the pilot.

In 2022, Warren was cast as the lead in the CBS cop drama East New York. She plays Regina Haywood: the newly promoted deputy inspector of the East New York neighborhood in East Brooklyn. The show was picked up for series and set for a fall debut during the 2022-23 United States network television schedule.
In 2021, Warren was cast as Camille De Haan, mother of titular character Monet De Haan, in the 2021 reboot of Gossip Girl.

Filmography

Film

Television

References

External links
 

African-American actresses
American film actresses
American television actresses
Living people
1982 births
21st-century American actresses
People from Coquille, Oregon
21st-century African-American women
21st-century African-American people
20th-century African-American people
20th-century African-American women